Darling or Dawlei is a Mara village in Matupi township of Chin State in western part of Myanmar, earlier known as Burma. Locally, the Mara natives called it Dawlei, and its transliteration in Hakha dialect is Darling.

Population
The population of Darling is 650 in 1997.

People
It is a Mara village and therefore, the people in this village are ethnic Mara people, who forms a distinct ethnic group inhabiting a contiguous 61 villages around this area.

Education
Darling has Middle School. Though a small village, Darling is known for producing many educated Maras in Myanmar.

Religion
With the arrival of pioneer missionaries to Mara people, Rev. & Mrs. R.A. Lorrain to Maraland on September 26, 1907, the people of Darling are 100 percent Christians. Majority of them belong to Mara Evangelical Church in Myanmar, founded by the pioneer missionaries. Christianity plays an important role in shaping their lives and especially in the field education, which is vital to the development of the people.

Related links
Maraland.net: The home of Mara people on the internet
Maraland.org
Samaw.com - English blog for Mara people

References

Populated places in Chin State